The Craica is a right tributary of the river Lăpuș in Romania. It flows into the Lăpuș near Lăpușel.

References

Rivers of Romania
Rivers of Maramureș County